L'Arène des rumeurs is the first album of the French rock group Zebda, released in 1992.

Liste des titres 
 Arabadub
 Baudis
 Mala diural
 Minot des minorités
 CNN
 Singing
 Le Masque au rade
 La Bague à Danièle
 Le Miroir
 La France
 Mala diural (À la Skabyle)
 Baïonettes
 D'Ève à Lise

References

Zebda albums
1992 debut albums